In applied linguistics and educational psychology, competency evaluation is a means for teachers to determine the ability of their students in other ways besides the standardized test.

Usually this includes portfolio assessment. In language testing, it may also include student interviews and checklists (e.g., on a scale from 1 to 5 the student or teacher rates his or her ability to do such tasks as introducing one's family).

While various governments in Europe and Canada often employ competency evaluation to evaluate bilingual abilities of public employees, it has only recently begun to receive attention from the United States where large testing corporations have dominated language evaluation with financially lucrative performance tests such as the TOEFL, MCAT and SAT tests. In psychology, competency can be evaluation to cover civil affairs, such as competency to handle personal finances, and competency to handle personal affairs (such as signing contracts).

References

1. Bachman, L. F., & Palmer, A. S. (2015). Language testing in practice: designing and developing useful language tests. Oxford: Oxford University Press.

Language assessment
Psychological testing
Student assessment and evaluation